Viliami Tahitu'a (born 10 September 1992) is a rugby union centre who plays for Tonga.
Tahitu'a made his debut for Tonga in July 2015 and was part of the Tonga squad at the 2015 Rugby World Cup.	

He was selected again for the Tongan squad in 2017.

References

External links

Living people
Tongan rugby union players
1992 births
Tonga international rugby union players
Shizuoka Blue Revs players
Northland rugby union players
Expatriate rugby union players in Japan
Rugby union centres